Alfred Tourville (9 September 1908 – 22 June 1983) was a Canadian cyclist. He competed in the individual and team road race events at the 1928 Summer Olympics.

References

External links
 

1908 births
1983 deaths
Canadian male cyclists
Olympic cyclists of Canada
Cyclists at the 1928 Summer Olympics
Cyclists from Montreal